Goruran may refer to:
 Goruran-e Chahar Dang
 Goruran-e Do Dang
 Goruran-e Olya
 Goruran-e Sofla